Pierre Bouladou (18 November 1925 – 29 December 2022) was a French weightlifter. He competed in the men's middleweight event at the 1948 Summer Olympics.

References

External links
 

1925 births
2022 deaths
French male weightlifters
Olympic weightlifters of France
Weightlifters at the 1948 Summer Olympics
Sportspeople from Montpellier
20th-century French people